Potter wasps (or mason wasps), the Eumeninae, are a cosmopolitan wasp group presently treated as a subfamily of Vespidae, but sometimes recognized in the past as a separate family, Eumenidae.

Recognition

Most eumenine species are black or brown, and commonly marked with strikingly contrasting patterns of yellow, white, orange, or red (or combinations thereof), but some species, mostly from tropical regions, show faint to strong blue or green metallic highlights in the background colors. Like most vespids, their wings are folded longitudinally at rest. They are particularly recognized by the following combination of  characteristics: 
 a posterolateral projection known as a parategula on both sides of the mesoscutum;
 tarsal claws cleft;
 hind coxae with a longitudinal dorsal carina or folding, often developed into a lobe or tooth, and;
 fore wings with three submarginal cells.

Biology

Eumenine wasps are diverse in nest building. The different species may either use existing cavities (such as beetle tunnels in  wood, abandoned nests of other Hymenoptera, or even man-made holes like old nail holes and screw shafts on electronic devices) that they modify in several degrees, or they construct their own either underground or exposed nests. The nest may have one or several individual brood cells. The most widely used building material is mud made of a mixture of soil and regurgitated water, but many species use chewed plant material, instead.

The  name "potter wasp" derives from the shape of the mud nests built by species of Eumenes and similar genera. It is believed that Native Americans based their pottery designs upon the form of local potter wasp nests.

All known eumenine species are predators, most of them solitary mass provisioners, though some isolated species show primitive states of social behaviour and progressive provisioning.

When a cell is completed, the adult wasp typically collects beetle larvae, spiders, or caterpillars and, paralyzing them, places them in the cell to serve as food for a single wasp larva. For example, Euodynerus foraminatus paralyzes the larvae of the poison hemlock moth (A. alstroemeriana). As a normal rule, the adult wasp lays a single egg in the empty cell before provisioning it. Some species lay the egg in the opening of the cell, suspended from a thread of dried fluid. When the wasp larva hatches, it drops and starts to feed upon the supplied prey for a few weeks before pupating. The complete lifecycle may last from a few weeks to more than a year from the egg until the adult emerges. Adult potter wasps feed on floral nectar.

Taxonomy

Potter wasps are the most diverse subfamily of vespids, with almost 200 genera, and contain the vast majority of species in the family (nearly 3,000 species from a total of about 4,500 in the whole family). The overwhelming morphological diversity of the potter wasp species is reflected in the proliferation of genera described to group them into more manageable groups. The subfamily Zethinae was formerly included here, but was removed when it was recognized that it rendered Eumeninae paraphyletic.

Gallery

References

Carpenter, J. M. & B. R. Garcete-Barrett. 2003. A key to the neotropical genera of Eumeninae (Hymenoptera: Vespidae). Boletín del Museo Nacional de Historia Natural del Paraguay 14: 52–73.  
Giordani Soika, 1989. Terzo contributo alla conoscenza degli eumenidi afrotropicali (Hymenoptera). Societa Veneziana di Scienze Naturali Lavori 14(1) 1989: 19–68.
Giordani Soika, A. 1992. Di alcuni eumenidi nuovi o poco noti (Hymenoptera Vespoidea). Societá Veneziana di Scienze Naturali Lavori 17 1992: 41–68.
Giordani Soika, A. 1993. Di alcuni nuovi eumenidi della regione orientale (Hym. Vespoidea). Bollettino del Museo Civico di Storia Naturale di Venezia 42, 30 giugno 1991(1993): 151–163.
Gusenleitner. 1992. Zwei neue Eumeniden-Gattungen und -Arten aus Madagaskar (Vespoidea, Hymenoptera). Linzer Biologische Beiträge 24(1) 1992: 91–96.
CSIRO Entomology Division. 1991. The Insects of Australia: a textbook for Students and Research. 2nd Edition. Melbourne University Press and Cornell University Press. 1137 pp.
Saussure, Henri de. 1852.  Monographie des guêpes solitaires ou de la tribu des Euméniens. Genève, J. Cherbuliez, Paris,  V. Masson.

External links

Eumenes spp., potter wasps of Florida on the UF / IFAS Featured Creatures Web site
Vespidae: Potter wasps; Vespid wasps; Social wasps; Hornets; Paper wasps; Yellowjackets
Subfamily Eumeninae - Potter and Mason Wasps

Biological pest control wasps